Northern glider may refer to:

 Tramea transmarina, a species of dragonfly found in Asia, Australia and the Pacific
 Petaurus abidi, a marsupial in the family Petauridae, endemic to Papua New Guinea

Animal common name disambiguation pages